Fatso may refer to:

Animals
 The proper name of Keyboard Cat (now deceased), a cat who became the subject of an Internet meme
 Fatso (crocodile), a saltwater crocodile in captivity in Western Australia

Arts, entertainment, and media

Fictional characters
 Sergeant "Fatso" Judson, a character in the 1953 American film From Here to Eternity
 Fatso, a member of the Ghostly Trio and one of Casper the Friendly Ghost's uncles
 Fatso, a wombat from the Australian television series A Country Practice
 The Mancubus or Fatso, a character in the video game Doom II

Films
 Fatso (1980 film), an American film directed by Anne Bancroft
 Fatso (2008 film), a Norwegian film directed by Arild Fröhlich
 Fatso!, a 2012 Indian film directed by Rajat Kapoor

Literature
 Fatso, a 1987 autobiography by retired American football player Art Donovan
 FAT!SO?, a 1998 book by Marilyn Wann

Music
 Fatso (band), a band who featured on the TV series Rutland Weekend Television

People
 Leonard DiMaria (born 1941), New York mobster nicknamed Fatso
 Vincenzo Licciardi (born 1965), Italian criminal clan boss nicknamed "'o Chiatto" (Fatso)

Other uses
 FTO gene, or Fatso, a gene linked to obesity and type 2 diabetes
 Fatso the Fat-Arsed Wombat, an unofficial mascot of the Sydney 2000 Olympics
 Fatso (service), an online DVD rental service in New Zealand